Ortwin Czarnowski (born 21 July 1940) is a German former cyclist. He competed in the individual road race and the team time trial events at the 1968 Summer Olympics.

References

External links
 

1940 births
Living people
People from Oder-Spree
People from the Province of Brandenburg
German male cyclists
Cyclists from Brandenburg
Olympic cyclists of West Germany
Cyclists at the 1968 Summer Olympics
20th-century German people